Hybrid picking is a guitar-playing technique that involves picking with a pick (plectrum) and one or more fingers alternately or simultaneously. Hybrid picking allows guitar players who use a pick to perform music which would normally require fingerstyle playing. It also facilitates wide string leaps (e.g. from the sixth string to the second string, etc.) which might otherwise be quite difficult. The technique is not widespread in most genres of guitar playing (though notable exceptions exist), but is most often employed in "chicken pickin'"; rockabilly, country, honky-tonk, and bluegrass flatpicking styles who play music which occasionally demands fingerstyle passages.

Generally the pick is used to play bass notes, which are emphasized by increased amplitude, longer duration, and timbral difference. In notation the flatpicked notes are indicated by placing the down bow and up bow symbols (𝆪 and 𝆫) below or next to the notehead of the flatpicked note rather than above the staff or tablature as a whole.

Technique

Players who use hybrid picking generally hold the pick in the traditional grip, between the index finger and thumb. Since this only involves the use of two fingers, it leaves three fingers of the picking hand free, which allows for hybrid picking.

Hybrid picking allows a picking guitarist to play some things otherwise impossible; however, there are limitations to the technique. The primary issue stems from the angle at which the free fingers must pick the strings. While a player who only uses his or her fingers to pluck the strings (e.g., a classical guitarist) holds their hand at such an angle that the fingers travel perpendicular to the strings, allowing for a clear attack, a player holding the pick naturally positions their hand such that the pick strikes perpendicular to the strings, putting the fingers in a position almost parallel to the strings. This makes the attack of the free fingers of a hybrid picking guitarist considerably weaker than that of a purely fingerpicking guitarist, unless significant changes are made to the hybrid picker's hand position. The angle of the fingers for a hybrid picker also limits the speed at which fingerpicked notes can be played, though speed can be achieved as normal using the plectrum. The timbre of fingerpicked notes is described as, "result[ing] in a more piano-like attack," and less like pizzicato.

Guitarists notable for their use of hybrid picking

See also
Alternate picking

References

Further reading
 
 
 
 

Guitar performance techniques